This is a list of West Indian Twenty20 International cricketers. A Twenty20 International is an international cricket match between two representative teams, each having ODI status, as determined by the International Cricket Council (ICC). A Twenty20 International is played under the rules of Twenty20 cricket. The list is arranged in the order in which each player won his first Twenty20 cap. Where more than one player won his first Twenty20 cap in the same match, those players are listed alphabetically by surname.

Key

Players
Statistics are correct as of 21 October 2022.

See also
Twenty20
West Indian cricket team
List of West Indies Test cricketers
List of West Indies ODI cricketers

Notes

References

West Indian Twenty20
West Indies